Art Center College of Design (stylized as ArtCenter College of Design) is a private art college in Pasadena, California.

History
ArtCenter College of Design was founded in 1930 in downtown Los Angeles as the Art Center School.

In 1935, Fred R. Archer founded the photography department, and Ansel Adams was a guest instructor in the late 1930s.  During and after World War II, ArtCenter ran a technical illustration program in conjunction with the California Institute of Technology.

In 1947, the post-war boom in students caused the school to expand to a larger location in the building of the former Cumnock School for Girls in the Hancock Park neighborhood, while still maintaining a presence at its original downtown location.

The school began granting Bachelor's and Master's degrees in arts in 1949, and was fully accredited by the Western Association of Schools and Colleges in 1955.

In 1965, the school changed its name to Art Center College of Design.

The school expanded its programs, including a film program in 1973.

The school moved to the Hillside Campus in Pasadena in 1976.

The school operated ArtCenter Europe in Vevey, Switzerland from 1986 to 1996.

In 2003, ArtCenter was granted Non-Governmental Organization status by the UN Department of Public Information.

ArtCenter opened the South Campus in Pasadena in 2004.

In 2019, ArtCenter revealed they exceeded their $100 million goal when their fundraising campaign for additional scholarships and expanding their south campus started in 2011. ArtCenter raised $124 million from more than 7,000 contributions.

ArtCenter celebrated their 90th anniversary on April 16, 2020. The planned celebration was rescheduled due to the coronavirus pandemic.

Academics
ArtCenter offers undergraduate and graduate programs in a wide variety of art and design fields, as well as public programs for children and high school students, and continuing studies for adults in the Los Angeles metro area. It is one of the few schools to offer a degree in Interaction Design. The college maintains two campuses in Pasadena; both are considered architecturally notable.

ArtCenter built its reputation as a vocational school, preparing returning G.I.s for work in the commercial arts fields and began awarding degrees in 1949. In recognition of Art Center's commitment to addressing social and humanitarian issues through design, 2003 saw ArtCenter become the first design college to ever receive NGO (non-governmental organization) status by the United Nations.

The college logo is an orange circle, also known as the ArtCenter "Dot," which has been a part of the school's identity since its inception by founder Tink Adams and a small number of colleagues.

ArtCenter is accredited by the Western Association of Schools and Colleges and the National Association of Schools of Art and Design.

Rankings
While art and design schools aren't regularly included in typical undergraduate rankings such as "U.S. News & World Report," ArtCenter has been recognized by a number of national and industry publications. The college's undergraduate and graduate industrial design programs are consistently ranked number one by DesignIntelligence. U.S. News & World Report also ranks Art Center's Art, Industrial Design and Media Design Practices programs among the top 20 graduate schools in the U.S. Most recently, the growing influence of Art Center's Film programs resulted in the college's ranking among The Hollywood Reporter's list of the Top 25 Global Film Schools.

In 2014, Money magazine ranked Art Center third on its list of 25 of the best college values and in 2013, Coroflot's 2013 Creative Employment Snapshot respondents showed Art Center alumni earning more compared to peer institutions.

In 2021, ArtCenter was ranked the tenth  globally according to the QS World University Rankings by the subject Art and Design.

Facilities
ArtCenter College of Design maintains two campuses in Pasadena: Hillside Campus and South Campus.

Hillside Campus

Designed by modernist architect Craig Ellwood, the Hillside Campus broke ground in November 1974. Opening in 1976, the building was later expanded with the south wing, designed by former Ellwood associate James Tyler, and constructed between 1989 and 1991. The Hillside Campus houses classrooms and studio space, multiple computer labs, the James Lemont Fogg Memorial Library, a model shop with traditional tools as well as rapid prototyping technologies (multi-axis CNC, laser-cutting, and multiple types of 3D printing), painting facilities, the Color, Material, and Trends Exploration Lab (CMTEL), an (Auto) Interior Simulation Lab, the Sinclaire Pavilion, photo and film stages with printing and editing facilities, and both a curated student gallery and an external exhibit gallery, both open to the public. The Hillside Campus has been designated as a historic monument by the City of Pasadena.

South Campus
The South Campus opened in 2004 in a former aircraft-testing facility built during World War II. Renovated by the Santa Monica-based firm Daly Genik, it houses the graduate Art and the Media Design Practices programs and studios, exhibition space for both of those programs, a print shop, a letterpress studio, and public programs  such as ArtCenter at Night, ArtCenter for Kids, Design-Based Learning Lab. There is an  exhibition space known as the Wind Tunnel, which is currently the home of the Media Design Practices program.  The Wind Tunnel has hosted events including the biannual ArtCenter Design Conference, like 2006's "Radical Craft" and 2008's "Serious Play"; an annual Summit on Sustainable Mobility; large exhibitions such as "Supersonic: 1 Wind Tunnel, 8 Schools, 120 Artists", "Gardenlab", and "Open House: Architecture and Technology for Intelligent Living" (with Vitra Design Museum); and various community meetings and events.

In 2012, ArtCenter announced the expansion of South Campus with the acquisition of a former U.S. Postal Service property adjacent to the existing campus, made entirely possible through the college's philanthropic efforts. At that time, the college appointed Michael Maltzan Architecture as its partner in planning academic spaces and expansion of its educational resources. With this agreement still intact, actual renovation of the former USPS building was completed by Darin Johnstone Architecture in 2014. Also in 2014, ArtCenter announced the acquisition of an office building at the "gateway" to Pasadena and future plans for new student housing, all of which will elevate South Campus from a "satellite" location to equal programs and activities found at the Hillside Campus.

In 2014, ArtCenter announced a $2 million gift to establish the Hoffmitz Milken Center for Typography “to advance the research, teaching and understanding of letterform design.” The center is named after 20-year Art Center typography teacher Leah Toby Hoffmitz Milken  and the establishing gift was made by the Lowell Milken Family Foundation.

Notable people

See also
 List of colleges and universities in California

References

External links

 

 
1930 establishments in California
Animation schools in the United States
Art in Greater Los Angeles
Art schools in California
Buildings and structures in Pasadena, California
Design schools in the United States
Education in Pasadena, California
Educational institutions established in 1930
Graphic design schools in the United States
Private universities and colleges in California
Schools accredited by the Western Association of Schools and Colleges
Universities and colleges in Los Angeles County, California
Film schools in California
Art museums and galleries in California